Ruisseauville is a commune in the Pas-de-Calais department in the Hauts-de-France region of France.

Geography
Ruisseauville lies 15 miles (24 km) east of Montreuil-sur-Mer, just to the south of Fruges, on the D928 road.

History
It was liberated in September 1944 by the Polish 1st Armoured Division.

Population

Places of interest
 The church of St.Nicaise, dating from the seventeenth century

See also
Communes of the Pas-de-Calais department

References

Communes of Pas-de-Calais